Almadraba (from Andalusi Arabic  almaḍraba, meaning 'the place to strike, also derived into ) is an elaborate and ancient technique for trapping and catching Atlantic bluefin tuna (Thunnus thynnus) originally used by the Phoenicians and developed to its current form in southeastern Iberia during the Islamic period.

The technique, in its most simple iteration, consists in setting up net barriers so as to trap the tuna when they migrate into the Mediterranean Sea from the Atlantic Ocean (February to July), on their way to spawn and
until recently, on their return journey, ("al revés"); the bycatch contains, among others, bullet tuna (auxis rochei), little tunny (euthynnus alletteratus), Atlantic bonito (sarda sarda), bigeye tuna (thunnus obesus) and swordfish (xiphias gladius).

It is a traditional form of fishing practiced mainly in southeastern Spain (Andalusia, Murcia and southern Valencian Community), Morocco and southern Portugal (the Algarve). Almadradas have been set from the ports of Cádiz, Chiclana de la Frontera, Conil de la Frontera, Barbate, Rota, Zahara de los Atunes, La Línea de la Concepción, Nueva Umbría, Isla Cristina, Ceuta and Tarifa, among other ports.

A similar technique exists in Sicily known as mattanza (a borrowing from the Spanish word matanza, meaning slaughter), introduced either by the Moors during Sicily's own Islamic period or by the Spanish afterwards.

In film 
 Roberto Rossellini's Stromboli includes documentary shots of the mattanza.
 Rupert Murray's The End of the Line (2009 film) demonstrates almadraba when discussing declining catches.
 Portuguese short documentary film :pt::A Almadraba Atuneira, directed by Antonio Campos.

See also 
 Barbate, town known for its Almadraba fishing.
 The Dukes of Medina-Sidonia made their fortune on the monopoly of Andalusian almadrabas from the 12th to the 19th century.
 Zahara de los Atunes, an Andalusian town named after the tunas of its almadraba.
 Castle of Zahara de los Atunes and Palace of Jadraza
 Cartagena
 Tavira Island, in the Algarve, Portugal.

References 

Fishing equipment
Fishing in Portugal
Fishing in Spain
Fishing in Italy
Fishing in Morocco
Scombridae